The Birth of Patriotism is a 1917 American silent war drama film directed by E. Magnus Ingleton and starring Irene Hunt, Ann Forrest, and Leo Pierson. Based on a story by I.A.R. Wylie, it is set in England during the First World War.

Plot summary 
Carelessness on the part of Johnny Roberts and the growing drudgery of married life causes an estrangement between Johnny and his wife Mary. The final break comes when Johnny, sick with a fever, returns home to be accused of drunkenness by Mary. Johnny leaves his wife to seek solace in Anne, the innkeeper's daughter, and the two live happily together until the outbreak of the war. When England is threatened, Johnny enlists and is sent to the front. In the meantime, Mary, with her little baby, seeks Anne out to ask for some of her husband's money to take care of the child. A mutual understanding springs up between the two women and upon Johnny's arrival home, the self-sacrificing Anne disappears and Johnny returns to his wife and child.

Cast
 Irene Hunt as Anne
 Ann Forrest as Mary 
 Leo Pierson as Johnny Roberts
 Ernest Shields as Sam Peters 
 Frank Caffray as Ike
 Lydia Yeamans Titus as Sallie Hawkins
 J. Edwin Brown as Gus Hawkins

References

Bibliography
 Leslie Midkiff DeBauche. Reel Patriotism: The Movies and World War I. Univ of Wisconsin Press, 1997.

External links
 

1917 films
1917 war films
1910s English-language films
American silent feature films
American war films
American World War I films
American black-and-white films
Universal Pictures films
Films set in England
1910s American films